"All Because of You" is a song by Irish rock band U2. It is the sixth track on their eleventh studio album, How to Dismantle an Atomic Bomb (2004). The song was released as the album's second single in North America on 8 February 2005 and as the fourth single in other territories on 10 October 2005. The song was released for airplay in the United States concurrently with the album release date (the first single, "Vertigo", had been released prior to the album debut).

Chart performance
The song debuted at number twenty-seven on the Billboard Modern Rock Tracks chart and went on to reach number six. It entered at 39 on the Billboard Mainstream Rock Tracks chart three weeks after its release and reached number 20. However, the single's airplay quickly diminished. The song achieved significantly less success than the second American single released from U2's previous two albums, both of which spent several months on the Billboard Hot 100.

"All Because of You" was released in the United Kingdom on 10 October 2005. It was added to Xfm London's playlist and BBC Radio 1's C-list, later moving to the B-list. The song finally made it to the A-list on 28 September. The song also made it onto BBC Radio 2's B-list. The song jumped to number ten on the airplay chart on 10 October, after lingering around number 50 for a month. "All Because of You" entered the singles chart at number four, but slipped out of the Top 40 just two weeks later. It also failed to chart in the UK download chart.

Live performances
"All Because of You" was regularly performed early on in the Vertigo Tour, though as the tour progressed it missed a large number of shows. When it was performed it typically opened the second encore. Bono has introduced it live as "a love song to The Who", acknowledging The Who's obvious influence on the song's sound. He also plays the tambourine during the live performances of the song.

The song was eventually performed live again on the 2018 Experience + Innocence Tour, where it was regularly performed in the set's first act.

Music video
The music video for this song was filmed in New York City. The band played aboard a flat bed truck riding around Manhattan, playing the song much to the surprise of many New Yorkers. U2's performance through New York took them from Manhattan to Brooklyn, where they would perform a surprise mini-concert.

Formats and track listings

Note for Version 3: This was the DVD single to "All Because of You." The "Single Mix" to "All Because of You" was an audio track.

Note
This was the Canada-only version of this single, released on 8 February 2005.

Note
This was the Digital download release, released on 10 October 2005.

Charts

Weekly charts

Year-end charts

Release history

References

2005 singles
U2 songs
Canadian Singles Chart number-one singles
Island Records singles
Interscope Records singles
Song recordings produced by Jacknife Lee
Songs written by Bono
Songs written by the Edge
Songs written by Adam Clayton
Songs written by Larry Mullen Jr.
Song recordings produced by Steve Lillywhite
Music videos directed by Phil Joanou